The ISU World Standings and Season's World Ranking are the objective merit-based method used by the International Skating Union (ISU) for single & pair skating and ice dance, as well as synchronized skating. Only eligible skaters/teams will be considered in the ISU World Standings and Season's World Ranking.

Skaters/teams receive points based on their final placement at an event and the event's weight over the current and preceding two seasons. The ISU World Standings and Season's World Ranking are updated after each eligible events. At the end of the current season, the points from the earliest season are deleted. If pairs and ice dance couples officially split up, their partnership will be removed from the Standings and Ranking. When a skater officially announces his or her retirement from competition, the standing and rank of the skater will be removed.

Overview 
The ISU Council had implemented the former world standings system for single & pair skating and ice dance for several seasons before 2010. The world standings system for synchronized skating and the season's world ranking had not been implemented until 2010.

According to the "ISU Communication 1629" and "ISU Communication 1630" published by the ISU on July 21, 2010, the ISU Council decided to implement two types of World Standings / Ranking, namely "ISU World Standings" and "ISU Season's World Ranking", since the 2010–11 season.

The ISU World Standings for single & pair skating and ice dance, are taking into account results of the preceding two seasons and the current season, and remains the basis for the draws at ISU events and part of the criteria for the selection of competitors for the ISU Grand Prix of Figure Skating and other ISU events designated by the ISU Council.

The ISU Season's World Ranking, is based on the results of the current ongoing season only. It has the main purpose to reflect the current competitive performances of the skaters and give the public and the media an indication of the current actual competitiveness of the skaters.

The ISU World Standings for synchronized skating, are taking into account results of the preceding two seasons and the current season. The standings will also guarantee objectivity and a help for the process of individual entries to ISU events. There will be a separate ranking for "Senior" and "Junior".

The ISU World Standings and Season's World Ranking do not necessarily reflect the capabilities of some skaters/teams. Due to limits on entries to events (no more than three from each country), and varying numbers of high-level skaters/teams in each country, skaters/teams from some countries may find it more difficult to qualify to compete at major events. Thus, a skater/team with a lower season's best but from a country with few high-level skaters/teams may qualify to a major event while a skater/team with a much higher season's best but from a country with more than three high-level skaters/teams may not be sent. As a result, it is possible for a skater/team who regularly scores higher to end up with a much lower world standing.

Principles 
Since the introduction of the world standings system, the method used to calculate the standing points of a skater has changed several times.

Points distribution (since the 2010–11 season)

For single & pair skating and ice dance 
According to the "ISU Communication 1629" published by the ISU on July 21, 2010, the world standing of a skater is calculated based on the results over the current and preceding two seasons. Competitors receive points based on their final placement at an event and the event's weight. The following events receive points:
 ISU Championships (Worlds, Europeans, Four Continents, and Junior Worlds) and Olympic Winter Games: The best result by points per season, the best two results by points over three seasons.
 ISU Grand Prix and Final, ISU Junior Grand Prix and Final: The two best results by points per season, the best four results by points over three seasons.
 International senior calendar competitions: The two best results by points per season, the best four results by points over three seasons.

Current and intermediate season's earned points will count 100%, and previous season's earned points will count 70%. Following the current season's World Championships, the results from the earliest season are deleted. A new partnership starts with zero points — there is no transfer of world standing points if pairs or ice dance couples split up and form a new partnership, and the previous partnership will be removed from the World Standings. When a skater officially announces his or her retirement from competition, the standing of the skater will be removed.

The season's world ranking of a skater is calculated similarly to the overall world standing but is based on the results of the ongoing season only.

The ISU World Standings and Season's World Ranking order will be updated after each event mentioned in the following table. Only eligible skaters will be considered in the ISU World Standings and Season's World Ranking.

Distribution of Points (10% Steps)

 WC = World Championships
 OWG = Olympic Winter Games
 EC = European Championships
 FC = Four Continents Championships
 WJC = World Junior Championships
 GPF = Grand Prix Final
 GP = Grand Prix
 JGPF = Junior Grand Prix Final
 JGP = Junior Grand Prix
 CS = Challenger Series
 IC = International Senior Competitions

For synchronized skating 
According to the "ISU Communication 1630" published by the ISU on July 21, 2010, the world standing of a team is calculated based on the results over the current and preceding two seasons.

The ISU World Standings order will be updated after each event mentioned in the following table. Only eligible teams will participate in the ISU World Standings.

Distribution of Points (10% Steps)

 WC = World Championships
 WJC = World Junior Championships
 WJCC = World Junior Challenge Cup
 IC = International Senior Competitions
 IJC = International Junior Competitions

ISU World Standings for single & pair skating and ice dance

Current Standings

Men's singles 

*Changes from September 20, 2022

Women's singles 

*Changes since September 20, 2022

Pairs 

*Changes since September 20, 2022

Ice dance 

*Changes since September 20, 2022

Season-end No. 1 skaters 

The remainder of this section is a complete list, by discipline, of all skaters who are the No. 1 in the season-end standings ordered chronologically.

Men's singles

Women's singles

Pairs

Ice dance

Combined list

Skaters in the top 3 of the season-end Standings 

The remainder of this section is a complete list, by discipline, of all skaters who are in the top 3 of the season-end standings ordered chronologically.

Men's singles

Women's singles

Pairs

Ice dance

Records and statistics

ISU Season's World Ranking

Season's No. 1 skaters 

The remainder of this section is a complete list, by discipline, of all skaters who are the No. 1 in the season's rankings ordered chronologically.

Men's singles

Women's singles

Pairs

Ice dance

All disciplines

Skaters in the top 3 of the season's rankings 

The remainder of this section is a complete list, by discipline, of all skaters who are in the top 3 of the season's rankings ordered chronologically.

Men's singles

Women's singles

Pairs

Ice dance

Records and statistics

ISU World Standings for synchronized skating

Season-end No. 1 teams 

The remainder of this section is a complete list, by level, of all teams who are the No. 1 in the season-end standings ordered chronologically.

Senior Synchronized

Junior Synchronized

Teams in the top 3 of the season-end Standings 

The remainder of this section is a complete list, by level, of all teams who are in the top 3 of the season-end standings ordered chronologically.

Senior Synchronized

Junior Synchronized

See also 
 Figure skating records and statistics
 List of highest ranked figure skaters by nation
 List of ISU World Standings and Season's World Ranking statistics
 Major achievements in figure skating by nation

References

External links 
 International Skating Union
 ISU World standings for Single & Pair Skating and Ice Dance / ISU Season's World Ranking
 ISU World standings for Synchronized Skating

 
Standings and Ranking
Standings and Ranking
Sports world rankings
International Skating Union